Kiama Light, also known as Kiama Harbour Light, is an active lighthouse in Kiama, New South Wales, Australia. The lighthouse is located close to the Kiama Blowhole on Blowhole Point, south of Kiama Harbour.

History 

Tenders for the construction of the tower were called in 1886, ten years after Robertson Basin, a man-made basic, was opened in Kiama Harbour. The tower was commissioned on 1 January 1887. It was designed by Edward Orpen Moriarty MA MInstCE.

The light was established in 1887. The original apparatus was an oil burner with a catadioptric fixed lens and light intensity of 600 cd. Two houses were constructed, a principal lighthouse keeper's house close to the tower, and a one-story assistant keeper's house a bit further.

A report from 1913 says that the light is unwatched and the keeper's house is empty, though officially the station was only demanned in 1920. According to records, in 1920 the light was further upgraded to acetylene gas carbide lamp, the characteristic was changed to a group flashing and the light was automated.

The principal keeper's house was destroyed by vandals soon after this, though the other cottage remained as it was the residence of the harbour pilots.

in the 1920s. The assistant keeper's house was used for many years as the pilot's cottage and now serves as a museum and a tourist information centre.

In 1969 the light was electrified and connected to mains electricity, with a 120 V battery bank as backup. The current light source is a 120 V, 1000 W, quartz halogen lamp.

Structure 

The building is made of bricks, cemented outside and plastered within. Ascending the tower is done by three iron ladders leading from one storey to the next. The top of the structure is surrounded by an artistic railing.

The tower is surrounded by a hexagonal fence

Site operation 
The lighthouse is managed by Transport for NSW. The museum is managed by the Kiama Historical Society.

Visiting 
The site is accessible by road and parking is available. The museum is open on weekends, but the tower is closed to the public.

See also 

 List of lighthouses in Australia

Notes

References

External links 

Lighthouses completed in 1887
Lighthouses in New South Wales
1887 establishments in Australia